Dirksen is a surname. Notable people with the surname include:

Corra Dirksen (1938–2020), South African rugby union player
Dirk Dirksen (19372006), American music promoter and emcee
Emily Dirksen (born 1969), American rower
Everett Dirksen (18961969), U.S. politician
Dirksen Senate Office Building, in Washington, D.C., named after Everett Dirksen
Everett McKinley Dirksen United States Courthouse, in Chicago, Illinois, named after Everett Dirksen
Hanno Dirksen (born 1991), South African rugby union player
Herbert von Dirksen (18821955), German diplomat
Richard Wayne Dirksen (19212003), American musician and composer
Willibald von Dirksen (1852-1928), German landowner, politician and art collector

See also 
 

Dutch-language surnames
Patronymic surnames
Surnames from given names

de:Dirksen